Mike Hollifield is a footballer who played as a full back in the Football League for Wolverhampton Wanderers, Hull City and Tranmere Rovers. He finished his playing career in two stints with Wollongong City in the Australian National Soccer League.

References

External links 
 Mike Hollifield at Aussie Footballers

1961 births
Living people
Footballers from Middlesbrough
Association football fullbacks
English footballers
Wolverhampton Wanderers F.C. players
Hull City A.F.C. players
Tranmere Rovers F.C. players
Billingham Synthonia F.C. players
English Football League players